Fred Guidici (born November 8, 1964) is an American football coach. He is formerly the special teams coordinator at San Jose State University  Guidici served as the head football coach at Menlo College in Atherton, California from 2009 to 2011. For the 2020 season, Guidici transitioned in to an off-field role as an analyst with a focus on special teams.

Head coaching record

References

External links
 San Jose State profile

1964 births
Living people
Menlo Oaks football coaches
Oakland Raiders coaches
Santa Clara Broncos football coaches
San Jose SaberCats coaches
San Jose State Spartans football coaches
High school football coaches in California
Junior college football coaches in the United States
San Jose State University alumni
Sportspeople from Omaha, Nebraska